Milvydai (from the Lithuanian personal name Milvydas) could refer to several Lithuanian villages:
 
 Milvydai, Krakės, in Krakės Eldership of Kėdainiai District Municipality
 Milvydai, Pernarava, in Pernarava Eldership of Kėdainiai District Municipality
 Milvydai, Šalčininkai, in Šalčininkai District Municipality
 Milvydai, Šiauliai, in Šiauliai District Municipality.